The Trophy Room is an Australian sport-themed comedic television quiz show which first screened in 2010 on ABC1.

The show is hosted by stand-up comedian Peter Helliar, who poses questions to two teams headed by sports journalist Amanda Shalala and broadcaster Adam Spencer.

References

External links

Australian Broadcasting Corporation original programming
2010s Australian game shows
Australian comedy television series
2010 Australian television series debuts
2010 Australian television series endings
Australian panel games
Australian sports television series
Television series by ITV Studios